Real Life or Real Live(s) may refer to:
 Real life, the state of existence outside online or artificial interactions

Film and television
 Real Life (1979 film), an American comedy film by Albert Brooks
 Real Life (2004 film), a Greek drama film by Panos H. Koutras
 Real Life (TV program), an Australian tabloid TV program 1992–1994
 Real Life with Jane Pauley, an American news-magazine TV program 1990–1991
 Real Life with Sharon Caddy, a Canadian entertainment and lifestyle program that debuted in 2007
 "Real Life" (Star Trek: Voyager), a television episode
 Real Life (TV channel), an Australian subscription television channel only on Foxtel
 Real Lives (TV channel), a British channel

Literature
 Real Life (novel) a 2020 novel by Brandon Taylor
 Real Life, a 1986 novel by Kitty Burns Florey
 Real Life, a 1992 novel by D. J. Taylor
 Real Life (webcomic), a webcomic by Maelyn Dean
 REALLIFE Magazine, a New York City–based arts magazine

Music
 Real Life (band), an Australian band
 Real Live Tour, a 1993 concert tour by Iron Maiden
 Real Live, an American rap duo consisting of K-Def and Larry-O

Albums
 Real Life (Cindy Morgan album) or the title song, 1992
 Real Life (Crown of Creation album), 1994
 Real Life (Emeli Sandé album) or the title song, 2019
 Real Life (Evermore album) or the title song, 2006
 Real Life (Jeff Carson album) or the title song (see below), 2001
 Real Life (Joan as Police Woman album) or the title song, 2006
 Real Life (Lincoln Brewster album) or the title song, 2010
 Real Life (Magazine album), 1978
 Real Life (Marie Wilson album), 1998
 Real Life (Real Lies album), 2015
 Real Life (Simple Minds album) or the title song, 1991
 Real Life, by Jaki Graham, 1994
 Real Life, by R. J. Helton, 2004
 The Real Life (album), by Bread of Stone, or the title song, 2013
 Real Live, by Bob Dylan, 1984
 Real Live!, by Frank Marino and Mahogany Rush, 2004

Songs
 "Real Life" (Bon Jovi song), 1999
 "Real Life" (Jake Owen song), 2015
 "Real Life (I Never Was the Same Again)", by Jeff Carson, 2001
 "Real Life", by Burna Boy from Twice as Tall, 2020
 "Real Life", by Christopher, 2019
 "Real Life", by Duke Dumont and Gorgon City, 2017
 "Real Life", by Girls Aloud from What Will the Neighbours Say?, 2004
 "Real Life", by Imagine Dragons from Origins, 2018
 "Real Life", by Interpol from A Fine Mess, 2019
 "Real Life", by Ty Dolla Sign from Featuring Ty Dolla Sign, 2020
 "Real Life", by Vitamin C from More, 2001
 "Real Life", by the Weeknd from Beauty Behind the Madness, 2015
 "The Real Life", by Dave Lee recording as Raven Maize, 2001
 "The Real Life", by Dave Lee recording as Brad Hed, 2009

Other uses
 Real Life Amphitheater, Selma, Texas, US
 Real Life Ministries, a church in Post Falls, Idaho, US
 Real Lives, a 2001 educational video game

See also
 In Real Life (disambiguation)
 Real Life Adventures, a single-panel nationally syndicated daily comic
 Reality, the state of things as they actually exist
 Reel Life (disambiguation)